Gunnar Hansen (15 December 1923 – 24 September 2005) was a Norwegian footballer. He played in seven matches for the Norway national football team from 1947 to 1950.

References

External links
 

1923 births
2005 deaths
Norwegian footballers
Norway international footballers
Place of birth missing
Association footballers not categorized by position